The 14th edition of the Ronde van Drenthe, a women's cycling race in the Netherlands, was held on 23 October 2021.

Result

Source

References 

2021 UCI Women's World Tour
2021
2021 in Dutch women's sport